Iola Abraham Ikkidluak (1936–2003) was an Inuit sculptor from Kimmirut, Nunavut.

He participated in the Smithsonian Institution's 1979-1981 touring exhibition By the Light of the Qulliq. His work is included in the permanent collections of the National Gallery of Canada, the McMichael Canadian Art Collection, the Toronto-Dominion Bank Collection, the Winnipeg Art Gallery, the Musée national des beaux-arts du Québec, the National Museum of Finland, and the University of Michigan Museum of Art.

Ikkidluak's work frequently depicted Arctic animals, including polar bears, walruses, seals, whales, and birds.

He worked in soapstone, bone, antlers, and green serpentine.

His disc number was E7-923.

His wife Namonai (born 1944) was also an artist. Their son Tutuyea was also a carver.

References

1936 births
2003 deaths
20th-century Canadian sculptors
21st-century Canadian sculptors
Inuit sculptors
People from Kimmirut
Artists from Nunavut
Inuit from Nunavut
Canadian male sculptors
20th-century Canadian male artists
21st-century Canadian male artists